Grylloblatta siskiyouensis is a species of insect in the family Grylloblattidae. Its type locality is in Oregon Caves National Monument in the United States.

Range
Although it is currently known only from Oregon Caves National Monument, it may potentially also be found in other areas of the Siskiyou Mountains.

Habitat
It is found in caves and forests.

References

Grylloblattidae
Insects described in 2012
Insects of the United States
Cave insects